Ilham Fathoni (born 31 December 1997) is an Indonesian professional footballer who plays as an attacking midfielder or forward for Liga 2 club Nusantara United, on loan from Liga 1 club Persis Solo.

Club career

Sulut United
Fathoni signed with Sulut United to play in the Indonesian Liga 2 for the 2020 season. This season was suspended on 27 March 2020 due to the COVID-19 pandemic. The season was abandoned and was declared void on 20 January 2021.

Return to PSMS Medan
In 2021, Fathoni signed a contract with Indonesian Liga 2 club PSMS Medan. He made his league debut on 7 October 2021 in a match against KS Tiga Naga at the Gelora Sriwijaya Stadium, Palembang.

Persela Lamongan
He was signed for Persela Lamongan to play in Liga 1 in the 2021 season. Fathoni made his league debut on 6 January 2022 in a match against Persipura Jayapura at the Kapten I Wayan Dipta Stadium, Gianyar.

Persis Solo
Fathoni was signed for Persis Solo to play in Liga 1 in the 2022–23 season. He made his league debut on 7 August 2022 in a match against Persikabo 1973 at the Pakansari Stadium, Cibinong.

Career statistics

Club

References

External links
 Ilham Fathoni at Soccerway
 Ilham Fathoni at Liga Indonesia

1997 births
Living people
Indonesian footballers
PSPS Riau players
PSMS Medan players
Persela Lamongan players
Liga 1 (Indonesia) players
Liga 2 (Indonesia) players
Association football midfielders
People from Kampar, Perak